|}

The Kachy Stakes is a Listed flat horse race in Great Britain open to horses aged four years or older. It is run at Lingfield Park over a distance of 6 furlongs and 1 yard, and it is scheduled to take place each year in February.

The race was first run in 2007 as the Cleves Stakes. It was renamed from the 2021 running to honour Kachy, the winner of the race in 2018 and 2019. He broke the Lingfield Park track record in his 2019 win but suffered a fatal injury when running at the course in 2020.

Records

Most successful horse (2 wins):
 Rivellino - 2015, 2016
 Kachy - 2018, 2019

Leading jockey (2 wins):
 Richard Kingscote - Kachy (2018, 2019)
 Clifford Lee - Exalted Angel (2021), Spycatcher (2022)

Leading trainer (4 wins):
 Karl Burke - Rivellino (2015, 2016), Exalted Angel (2021), Spycatcher (2022)

Winners

See also
 Horse racing in Great Britain
 List of British flat horse races

References

 Racing Post:

Flat races in Great Britain
Lingfield Park Racecourse
Open sprint category horse races
2007 establishments in England
Recurring sporting events established in 2007